I Want That may refer to:

 I Want That!, a TV series on the Fine Living network 
 "I Want That", a 1959 song written by E. Lewis and Weisman, performed by Billy "Crash" Caddock in 1962
 "I Want That", a 2009 song by Psapp from The Camel's Back

See also
 I Want That You Are Always Happy, a 2011 album by the Middle East